Four for Tomorrow is the first story collection by Roger Zelazny, published in paperback by Ace Books in 1967. British hardcover and paperback editions followed in 1969, under the title A Rose for Ecclesiastes. The first American hardcover was issued in the Garland Library of Science Fiction in 1975. A French translation appeared in 1980 (as Une rose pour l'Ecclésiaste). Paperback reissues continued from Ace and later from Baen Books into the 1990s.

Contents

 Introduction (Theodore Sturgeon)
 "The Furies" (Amazing Stories 1965)
 "The Graveyard Heart" (Fantastic Stories 1964)
 "The Doors of His Face, the Lamps of His Mouth" (F&SF 1965)
 "A Rose for Ecclesiastes" (F&SF 1963)

"The Doors of His Face, the Lamps of His Mouth" won the Nebula Award and was nominated for the Hugo. "A Rose for Ecclesiastes" was nominated for the Hugo.

Reception

Judith Merril rated the collection "what may well prove the best reading-buy of 1967". P. Schuyler Miller similarly described it as "certainly going to be one of the 'must' books" of the year. Algis Budrys said that the stories could have been written by eminent authors like Henry Kuttner and C. L. Moore, Sturgeon, Ray Bradbury, Avram Davidson, Philip Jose Farmer, and W. B. Yeats, but Zelazny "is beginning where other famous people have arrived".

References

External links
 
 

Short story collections by Roger Zelazny
1967 short story collections
Ace Books books